"Jaspers' Warp", also known as "Crooked World", was a Marvel UK storyline featuring primarily the character Captain Britain. It was originally published between 1981 and 1984 in Marvel Superheroes, #377–388, The Daredevils, #1–11 and The Mighty World of Marvel, volume 2, #7–13.

The story features Alan Davis's first work with the Captain Britain character. It also features the only mainstream Marvel Universe work by Alan Moore, who took over writing of the storyline one-third of the way through the saga (Marvel Superheroes #387) when David Thorpe (who began the storyline) abruptly left the series. It officially designated the mainstream Marvel Universe with the label 616 and introduced many concepts regarding the Marvel Multiverse, such as the Captain Britain Corps and Saturnyne.

Plot

Earth-238
The Crooked World Storyline spun directly out of the events of the Black Knight strip in Hulk Weekly. After that story (called The Otherworld Saga) Captain Britain and his companion, the elf called Jackdaw, are dispatched by Merlyn back home to Captain Britain's Earth from the Otherworld, which is in another dimension.

During this journey through dimensions, Captain Britain's costume changes and Jackdaw gains a superhero costume, and he and Jackdaw find themselves on Earth. The pair quickly discover, however, that this Earth is not quite as Captain Britain knew it — they have various weird encounters, including fighting a monster made out of junk and a group of insane Alice in Wonderland-themed villains called The Crazy Gang and the mysterious Saturnyne and her henchmen, the Avant Guard.

Captain Britain discovers he is on an alternate Earth called Earth-238 which is under the control of Sir Jim Jaspers, the leader of The Crazy Gang and a powerful mutant with the ability to warp and change reality. Captain Britain learns that Jaspers was a British MP who had been in charge of regulating and eventually eliminating the superheroes of Earth-238. To carry out this massacre of this world's superheroes, Jaspers had created The Fury, an incredibly powerful creature able to destroy any super-powered person with the exception of Jaspers himself.

Jaspers had become insane, a side-effect of his reality-warping powers, and altered this Earth to fit his own insane ideas, hence why Captain Britain had not recognised this world. After seeing The Fury kill Jackdaw and Saturnyne flee this Earth, Captain Britain is confronted by Jaspers and is killed by The Fury.

Captain Britain however, is reconstructed in an improved form from virtually nothing by Merlyn and returned to his Earth, which is called Earth-616.

After moving back into Braddock mansion and meeting his old enemy, Slaymaster, in a battle in the streets of London he discovers that Saturnyne has been placed on trial for her part in the Earth 238 disaster after a battle with The Special Executive.

Returning with The Special Executive to act as a witness for Saturnyne, the Captain encounters various alternate versions of himself (later to be called the Captain Britain Corps) and sees the destruction of Earth 238 to stop the Jaspers Warp spreading from that reality.

Earth-616

Eventually returning home with The Special Executive and Saturnyne (who has been exiled) in tow, Captain Britain is confronted by Captain UK in Braddock Manor. Captain UK is his analogue from Earth 238 who was sent to Earth 616 during The Fury's massacre of her Earth's superheroes.

Captain UK warns him that his world's Jim Jaspers plans to regulate his planet's heroes as his Earth 238 counterpart had. As they discuss this they are attacked by The Fury, who has managed to escape the destruction of its reality and has come to Earth-616 to complete its mission to kill every superhero.

Captain Britain and The Special Executive — Captain UK is unable to fight as she is still scared after seeing The Fury kill her husband on Earth-238 — battle The Fury and several of The Special Executive are killed, but they manage to defeat The Fury for the time being. The Special Executive leave Earth to return to their own world, this leaves Captain Britain, Captain UK, Saturnyne, Betsy Braddock, her lover Tom Lennox and Alison Double (these last three are all-powerful telepaths) to confront the threat of Jaspers on their own.

Jaspers is elected British Prime Minister and his promises to outlaw superhumans is carried out by S.T.R.I.K.E. Concentration camps are built to imprison and execute superhumans but Captain Britain and his companions remain free but in hiding. Jaspers has also shown signs of the same powers his Earth-238 version showed and this world begins to slowly alter, warping reality darkly.

Shortly after Jaspers' election, the Vixen, one of his former allies, enters his office with two henchmen in an attempt to stop Jaspers by assassinating him. However, he quickly disposes of the two henchmen by warping their bodies horribly and then uses his reality-warping ability to transform the Vixen into a real vixen, a female red fox.

Immediately after this, Captain Britain decides to confront Jaspers (it is revealed that Merlyn had tested him on Earth-238 against a lesser version of Jaspers to prepare him for this greater menace) but he leaves his companions who are later discovered by Jaspers henchmen. Tom Lennox is killed; Betsy Braddock and Alison Double are captured, leaving Captain UK and Saturnyne to flee.

Captain Britain battles Mad Jim Jaspers in 10 Downing Street but Jaspers proves too powerful for him. However The Fury enters the battle, beating Captain Britain before tackling Jaspers himself in a battle that distorts reality itself. During Captain Britain and the Fury's battle, Jaspers takes his time to create an Earth-616 version of the Crazy Gang out of the Earth's soil. Captain Britain would later run into the Crazy Gang on a few occasions in later comics. While it was the Earth-238 Jaspers who constructed the Fury and had programmed it so it couldn't kill him, the Fury recognised that the Jaspers it was now facing was not its creator but an alternate reality counterpart. Thus its rules did not apply to the Earth-616 Jaspers and the Fury attacked him by incinerating him, something that Jaspers was able to undo with his powers. Also observing this battle were Saturnyne and Captain UK, who had now been convinced to wear her costume by Saturnyne.

The Fury eventually beats Jaspers by transporting him into an interuniversal void (where he couldn't use his reality-warping powers since there was no reality to warp) and used Jaspers' moment of surprise to fry his brain with a powerful electric shock, but is itself nearly destroyed in the process. Captain Britain takes advantage of this and attacks The Fury, nearly defeating it but The Fury still proves too powerful for him. However, recalling the death of her husband, Captain UK attacks The Fury and tears it apart in a fit of rage and anger. The Fury is defeated and wouldn't resurface until many years later, in Uncanny X-Men No. 445, where it appears to have regenerated and attacked the X-Men. Captain Britain, Captain UK, and Saturnyne are then transported to Otherworld by Roma, Merlyn's daughter.

Merlyn had died during the battle between The Fury and Jaspers and Roma had transported Captain Britain, Captain UK, and Saturnyne for Merlyn's funeral. During their time at the funeral, Roma reveals that Merlyn had used Captain UK as bait to draw The Fury to Earth-616 and help defeat Jaspers. Roma shows them that Earth is returning to normal and transports Captain Britain and Captain UK (Saturnyne returns to her own world) to Darkmoor on Earth-616.

The story ends with both Captains sharing a kiss and heading their separate ways.

Sequel
A sequel to this story is told in the X-Men: Die by the Sword (2007), which brought the death of Roma and the end of the New Excalibur title.

Collected editions
The story was originally reprinted in 1995 as a seven-issue limited series called X-Men Archives: Captain Britain. The limited series reprinted the story in full colour for the first time.

In 2002, the colourised version of the story was collected as a trade paperback. The trade paperback, simply titled "Captain Britain", omits the opening chapters of the storyline as written by writer Dave Thorpe, starting with Alan Moore's first issue on Captain Britain.

Though Alan Moore gave his blessing over the reprinting of the arc, he later rescinded it when Marvel omitted crediting Alan Moore as co-creator for several characters introduced in the arc (most notably the Special Executives and the Fury). Later publications corrected this omission.

Marvel has announced plans to release an Alan Moore/Alan Davis "Omnibus" hardcover of their respective works on Captain Britain. As such, the omnibus will feature the full and complete version of the "Jasper's Warp" storyline.

The opening of the story, written by Dave Thorpe, was collected as part of "Captain Britain: Legacy of A Legend" in 2016.

Die by the Sword was also collected in April 2008.

Notes

References

Sources 

 
 Jaspers' Warp at the International Catalogue of Superheroes
 The Crooked World Saga at the International Catalogue of Superheroes
 Mad Jim Jaspers of Earth-238 at the Appendix to the Handbook of the Marvel Universe
 Mad Jim Jaspers of Earth-616 at the Appendix to the Handbook of the Marvel Universe

External links 
 Alan Davis' original cover artwork for the X-Men Archives reprints

Marvel UK